The 2020 Mountain West Conference football season, part of that year's NCAA Division I FBS football season, is the 22nd season of college football for the Mountain West Conference (MW). Since 2012, 12 teams have competed in the MW football conference.

On August 10, 2020, the conference suspended all fall sports competitions due to the COVID-19 pandemic.

The season was scheduled to begin on September 3, 2020 and end on November 28, 2020. The Mountain West football Conference Championship Game was to be played on December 5, 2020. The entire schedule was released on February 27, 2020.

On September 24, 2020, the conference resumed Football, and is working on resuming other fall sports competitions. The Conference's amended regular-season schedule will begin on Saturday, Oct. 24, with the intent to play eight games. The MW Football Championship Game is slated for Saturday, Dec. 19. The new Mountain West schedule was released October 1.

Previous season

In 2019 Boise State won the Mountain Division with perfect a 8–0 Conference record conference record while Hawaii won the West Division with a 5–3 Conference record. Boise State defeated Hawaii 31–10 in the 2019 Mountain West Conference Football Championship Game which was held At Albertson's Stadium in Boise, Idaho

Preseason

Potential COVID-19 disruption
On May 12, 2020, California State University system chancellor Timothy White announced that all of its 23 campuses would hold essentially all classes in the 2020 fall term online. This in turn raised serious questions whether its member campuses—three of which (Fresno State, San Diego State, and San Jose State) are MW members—would be able to field teams in fall sports, including football, in light of statements by NCAA president Mark Emmert made on that organization's Twitter account on May 8:

No decision on football at any of the CSU institutions has been made. However, on the same day that the CSU chancellor made his remarks, the California Collegiate Athletic Association (CCAA), an NCAA Division II non-football league whose members are all CSU campuses, publicly announced that it had canceled its 2020 fall sports season.

Mountain West Media
The Mountain West Media days will be held at the Cosmopolitan July 28 and 29.

Preseason Poll
The Preseason Poll will be released in August 2020.

Rankings

Coaches

Coaching changes
There were six coaching changes for Mountain West football programs for the 2020 season. New Mexico head coach Bob Davie resigned on November 25 and was replaced by Arizona State defensive coordinator Danny Gonzales on December 17. Later that same day UNLV head coach Tony Sanchez also resigned and he was replaced by Oregon offensive coordinator Marcus Arroyo On December 11. Colorado State's Mike Bobo resigned on December 4 and was replaced by former Boston College head coach Steve Addazio. Fresno State head coach Jeff Tedford resigned on December 5 and was replaced on December 17 by Indiana offensive coordinator and former Fresno State assistant Kalen DeBoer. On January 8, San Diego State head coach Rocky Long announced his retirement from coaching and was replaced that same day by Aztecs defensive line coach and former head coach Brady Hoke. The final coaching change took place on January 14, when Hawaii head coach Nick Rolovich resigned to accept the head coaching position at Washington State and was replaced by ex-Arizona State head coach Todd Graham On January 21.

Head coaches

Schedule
The season began on October 3, 2020 and will end on December 19, 2020.

Regular season

Week One

Week Two

Week Three

Week Four

Week Five

Week Six

Week Seven

Week Eight

Week Nine

Week Ten

Championship Game

Postseason

Bowl Games

Rankings are from AP rankings. All times Mountain Time Zone. Mountain West teams shown in bold.

Awards and honors

Player of the week Honors

Mountain West Individual Awards
The following individuals received postseason honors as voted by the Mountain West Conference football coaches at the end of the season

All-conference teams

Ref:

All-Americans

The 2020 College Football All-America Teams are composed of the following College Football All-American first teams chosen by the following selector organizations: Associated Press (AP), Football Writers Association of America (FWAA), American Football Coaches Association (AFCA), Walter Camp Foundation (WCFF), The Sporting News (TSN), Sports Illustrated (SI), USA Today (USAT) ESPN, CBS Sports (CBS), FOX Sports (FOX) College Football News (CFN), Bleacher Report (BR), Scout.com, Phil Steele (PS), SB Nation (SB), Athlon Sports, Pro Football Focus (PFF) and Yahoo! Sports (Yahoo!).

Currently, the NCAA compiles consensus all-America teams in the sports of Division I-FBS football and Division I men's basketball using a point system computed from All-America teams named by coaches associations or media sources.  The system consists of three points for a first-team honor, two points for second-team honor, and one point for third-team honor.  Honorable mention and fourth team or lower recognitions are not accorded any points.  Football consensus teams are compiled by position and the player accumulating the most points at each position is named first team consensus all-American.  Currently, the NCAA recognizes All-Americans selected by the AP, AFCA, FWAA, TSN, and the WCFF to determine Consensus and Unanimous All-Americans. Any player named to the First Team by all five of the NCAA-recognized selectors is deemed a Unanimous All-American.

Home game attendance
TBA

NFL Draft

The following list includes all Mountain West players who were drafted in the 2021 NFL Draft.

Footnotes

References

 
Mountain West Conference football season